Cécile Odin (born 4 October 1965) is a French international cyclist active from 1983–1996. Odin raced in two Olympic Games, Los Angeles 1984 and Seoul 1988, finishing 11th & 28th in the Women's Road Race. She made 3rd place overall in the Women's Tour de France (Grande Boucle) in 1985 and 1994, winning stage 6 in 1994. She won a World Championship in 1991 as part of the French Women's Team Time Trial Team.

References

External links

1965 births
Living people
Sportspeople from Beauvais
French female cyclists
Olympic cyclists of France
Cyclists at the 1984 Summer Olympics
Cyclists at the 1988 Summer Olympics
Cyclists from Hauts-de-France
UCI Road World Champions (women)